Travelodge (formerly TraveLodge) refers to several hotel chains around the world. Current operations include: the United States, Canada, the United Kingdom, Spain, Ireland, New Zealand, Australia and several countries in Asia. However, many of these are operated by independent companies that have no connection with the brand in other countries. As of December 31, 2018, it has 435 properties with 31,005 rooms.

United States

The Travelodge brand was one of the first motel chains in the United States. Scott King, the Travelodge Corporation founder, was incorporated in Southern California in 1939. The first TraveLodge opened in San Diego in 1940. For many years, Travelodge was headquartered in El Cajon, California, east of San Diego. During its early years, TraveLodge emphasized itself as a budget motel chain that offered functional accommodations at rates lower than other chains. TraveLodge also emphasized that its motels were centrally located in or near downtown areas in order to be convenient to local restaurants, churches, theatres, shopping areas and tourist attractions. Today, however, there are many different hotel "tiers" that Travelodge offers, from budget-priced properties to full-service high-rise hotels. Travelodge purchased the Skylight Inn of America Inn in 1987, which was founded only five years prior in Cleveland, Ohio, and Lodge Keeper Group, which operated LK and Country Hearth, in 1990.

In 1996, the Forte Group sold the Travelodge operation in North America. The trademark rights and franchise system were acquired for $39 million by HFS Inc., owner of other hotel brands such as Days Inn and Ramada. HFS was later merged into Cendant Corporation, and Cendant's hotel services, including Travelodge, were spun off as Wyndham Hotels and Resorts in 2006.

Targeting families with children, Travelodge is well-known for its mascot Sleepy Bear, a smiling, sleep-walking teddy bear wearing a nightcap with his name, a nightshirt with the Travelodge logo, and slippers. The logo was created in 1954 by Robert Hale, while employed by Dan Lawrence Advertising agency of San Diego. Years ago, Travelodge would give a free toy plush bear to any child staying in the Sleepy Bear Den room, of which every Travelodge had at least one. The Sleepy Bear mascot has largely been retired, but can still be seen on some older Travelodge signs and is still used on some advertising. Travelodge also has a brand of lower-price motels called Thriftlodge with another mascot named TJ, a freckle-faced bear with a baseball cap and a T-shirt with the Thriftlodge logo and the name TJ on it.

Canada

The Canadian Travelodge hotels are unusual for a Wyndham chain. Though operating under the Travelodge brand, Travelodge Canada administers the Master Licence for Travelodge and Thriftlodge in Canada. Travelodge Canada Corp. is owned by Superior Lodging Development TL Corporation based in Calgary, Alberta.

With over 95 properties nationwide, Travelodge is the third-largest hotel chain in Canada.

United Kingdom

Travelodge has been running in the UK since the first hotel opened at Burton Upon Trent in 1985. The company has been through several changes of ownership and reached £1bn in debts by 2008. The chain is currently being financed by Goldman Sachs and the hedge fund groups GoldenTree Asset Management and Avenue Capital Group.

Asia / Australia
Headquartered in Australia and Singapore, Travelodge Hotels Asia is responsible for the development, management and franchise of all Travelodge hotels in 22 key markets throughout Asia. The launch of Travelodge Kowloon in Hong Kong in January 2017 marks the first strategic step and key milestone for Travelodge Hotels Asia. The company, owned by Singapore-listed ICP, has plans for expansion in other Asian countries including Thailand, Singapore, Malaysia, Indonesia and Japan within the next few years.

See also

References

Motels
Hotel chains
Franchises
Motels in the United States
Companies based in Morris County, New Jersey
American companies established in 1939
Hotels established in 1939
1939 establishments in California
Reuben Brothers
Wyndham brands
Private equity portfolio companies